Coryphium is a genus of beetles belonging to the family Staphylinidae.

The species of this genus are found in Europe and Northern America.

Species:
 Coryphium angusticolle Stephens, 1834 
 Coryphium arizonense (Bernhauer, 1912)

References

Staphylinidae
Staphylinidae genera